The 2006–07 Ohio Bobcats men's basketball team represented Ohio University in the college basketball season of 2006–07. The team was coached by Tim O'Shea and played their home games at the Convocation Center. They finished the season 19–13 and 9–7 in MAC play to finish fourth in the MAC East.

Roster

Coaching staff

Preseason
The preseason poll was announced by the league office on October 24, 2006.  Ohio was picked second in the MAC East.

Preseason men's basketball poll
(First place votes in parenthesis)

East Division
 
 Ohio
 
 Miami

West Division
 
 
 
 
 Eastern Michigan

Preseason All-MAC 

Source

Schedule and results
Source: 

|-
!colspan=9 style=| Regular Season

|-
|-
|-
|-
|-
|-
|-
|-
|-
|-
|-
|-
|-
|-
|-
|-
|-
|-
|-
|-
|-
|-
|-
|-
|-
|-
|-
|-
|-
|-
!colspan=9 style=| MAC Tournament

|-
|-

Statistics

Team Statistics
Final 2006–07 Statistics

Source

Player statistics

Source

Awards and honors

All-MAC Awards 

Source

References

Ohio Bobcats men's basketball seasons
Ohio
Bob
Bob